Jason Stoltenberg and Todd Woodbridge defeated Diego Nargiso and Eugenio Rossi in the final, 6–3, 7–6(7–2) to win the boys' doubles tennis title at the 1987 Wimbledon Championships.

Seeds

  Diego Nargiso /  Eugenio Rossi (final)
  Zeeshan Ali /  Brett Steven (semifinals)
  Jason Stoltenberg /  Todd Woodbridge (champions)
  Lan Bale /  Nicolás Pereira (semifinals)

Draw

Draw

References

External links

Boys' Doubles
Wimbledon Championship by year – Boys' doubles